The 30th Moscow International Film Festival was held from 19 to 28 June 2008. The Golden George was awarded to the Iranian film As Simple as That directed by Reza Mirkarimi.

Jury
 Liv Ullmann (Norway – Chairman of the Jury)
 Michael Glawogger (Austria)
 Irina Rozanova (Russia)
 Derek Malcolm (Great Britain)
 Sebastián Alarcón (Chile)

Films in competition
The following films were selected for the main competition:

Awards
 Golden George: As Simple as That by Reza Mirkarimi
 Special Jury Prize: Silver George: A Simple Heart by Marion Laine
 Silver George:
 Best Director: Javor Gardev for Zift
 Best Actor : Richard Jenkins for The Visitor
 Best Actress : Margherita Buy for Days and Clouds
 Silver George for the best film of the Perspective competition: Cumbia Connection by Rene U. Villareal
 Lifetime Achievement Award: Takeshi Kitano
 Stanislavsky Award: Isabelle Huppert
 FIPRESCI Prize: Once Upon a Time in the Provinces by Katya Shagalova
 Russian Critics Jury's Prize for Best Film in-competition: As Simple as That by Reza Mirkarimi

References

External links
Moscow International Film Festival: 2008 at Internet Movie Database

2008
2008 film festivals
2008 festivals in Europe
Mos
2008 in Moscow
June 2008 events in Russia